Michelle Kwan Figure Skating is a computer game released in 1999, starring American skater Michelle Kwan.

The player can create the skater, dress her, choose music and create a routine to it, and then compete in different skating competitions.

While it does not follow the strict rules of international skating, there are logical reasons behind creating a program.

External links
 Game's Description
 Download demo-1 (not working)
 Download demo - 2 (not working)
 Download demo - 3
 Download demo - 4

1999 video games
Figure skating video games
Video games developed in the United States
Video games featuring female protagonists
Windows games
Windows-only games
Kwan
Kwan
Video games based on real people